Financial services in China refers to the services provided in China by the finance industry:  banks, investment banks, insurance companies, credit card companies, consumer finance companies, government sponsored enterprises, and stock brokerages.

Securities trading

The China Securities Regulatory Commission (CSRC) has required since 2004 that newly appointed CEOs, deputy CEOs, and heads of supervisory boards at locally incorporated securities firms all pass a Chinese language ability examination to take up their posts. 
 In 2007, for example, Goldman Sachs partner Richard Ong was denied permission to take the job of CEO at Beijing joint venture Goldman Sachs Gao Hua Securities Co. because of his weak Chinese language abilities.

Electronic banking
In 1994, China started the "Golden Card Project," enabling cards issued by banks to be used all over the country through a network. The establishment of the China Association of Banks rapidly promoted the interbank card network and by the end of 2004, the inter-region-inter-bank network had reached 600 cities, including all prefecture-level cities and more than 300 economically developed county-level cities.

International ATMs
PRC citizens may apply for an international ATM card corresponding to an interbank network such as Cirrus or PLUS, but foreign residents may not. Foreign residents in PRC, however, may use such interbank networks at ATMs in PRC through ATM cards procured in foreign countries.

Interbank ATMs are common throughout the country, especially in densely populated urban areas such as Beijing.

See also
China Venture Capital Association
Economy of China
History of banking in China
Chinese financial system

References

External links
Renmin University of China Finance and Securities Research Institute

 
Finance in China